The Men's artistic individual all-around gymnastics competition at the 2022 Commonwealth Games in Birmingham, England was held on 31 July 2022 at the Arena Birmingham.

Schedule
The schedule was as follows:

All times are British Summer Time (UTC+1)

Results

Qualification

Qualification for this all-around final was determined in parallel with the team final.

Final
The results are as follows:

References

Men's